Conchylodes graphialis is a species of snout moth in the tribe Udeini of the subfamily Spilomelinae. It was described by William Schaus in 1912 based on material collected in Costa Rica.

References

Moths described in 1912
Spilomelinae